Reserve Township is a township in Allegheny County, Pennsylvania, United States. The population was 3,333 at the 2010 census.

Reserve Township was named for a broader area of land, including the township, which the state had reserved from sale for its own purposes.

Geography
Reserve Township is located at  (40.478369, -79.987872).

According to the United States Census Bureau, the township has a total area of 2.0 square miles (5.2 km2), all  land.

Demographics

As of the census of 2000, there were 3,856 people, 1,547 households, and 1,087 families residing in the township. The population density was 1,934.3 people per square mile (748.1/km2). There were 1,605 housing units at an average density of 805.1/sq mi (311.4/km2). The racial makeup of the township was 97.90% White, 1.35% African American, 0.18% Native American, 0.29% Asian, 0.16% from other races, and 0.13% from two or more races. Hispanic or Latino (U.S. Census) of any race were 0.44% of the population.

There were 1,547 households, out of which 29.5% had children under the age of 18 living with them, 56.8% were married couples living together, 9.5% had a female householder with no husband present, and 29.7% were non-families. 25.1% of all households were made up of individuals, and 11.8% had someone living alone who was 65 years of age or older. The average household size was 2.49 and the average family size was 3.02.

In the township the population was spread out, with 22.3% under the age of 18, 6.9% from 18 to 24, 28.5% from 25 to 44, 23.9% from 45 to 64, and 18.5% who were 65 years of age or older. The median age was 41 years. For every 100 females there were 93.7 males. For every 100 females age 18 and over, there were 89.4 males.

The median income for a household in the township was $39,201, and the median income for a family was $43,298. Males had a median income of $36,541 versus $25,688 for females. The per capita income for the township was $17,676. About 5.6% of families and 8.4% of the population were below the poverty line, including 10.8% of those under age 18 and 11.2% of those age 65 or over.

Government and Politics

Education
Reserve Township is served by the Shaler Area School District.

References

External links
Township website
Reserve Township Police Department

Townships in Allegheny County, Pennsylvania